State Road A1A Alternate (also Alternate A1A and Alternate State Road A1A) may refer to all or part of the following roads that had, at one time, this designation by the Florida Department of Transportation but have since been renumbered:

Florida State Road 707
Florida State Road 732
Florida State Road 811
Florida State Road 842

All of the above contain parts of former alignments of State Road A1A.

A1A Alternate